The Clusiaceae or Guttiferae Juss. (1789) (nom. alt. et cons. = alternative and valid name) are a family of plants including 13 genera and ca 750 species. Several former members of Clusiacae are now  placed in Calophyllaceae and Hypericaceae. They are mostly trees and shrubs, with milky sap and fruits or capsules for seeds. The family is primarily tropical. More so than many plant families, it shows large variation in plant morphology (for example, three to 10, fused or unfused petals, and many other traits). According to the APG III, this family belongs to the order Malpighiales.

One feature which is sometimes found in this family, and rarely in others (e.g., Malpighiaceae), is providing pollinators with "pollination rewards" other than pollen or nectar; specifically, some species offer resin, which certain bees use in nest construction (each Clusiaceae species offers only one type of reward).

Taxonomic history 
The family Clusiaceae was divided by Cronquist into two subfamilies: the Clusioideae (typical subfamily) and the Hypericoideae. The latter was often treated as a family—the Hypericaceae or St. John's wort family. Elements of the Hypericoideae are more common in northern temperate areas and those of the Clusioideae  are centered in the tropics.

Later classifications, however, divide the family in a finer way. Molecular studies have shown that the family Podostemaceae—the riverweeds—as well as the Bonnetiaceae are nested in this group. Their inclusions make the Clusiaceae in a wide sense polyphyletic, and Stevens's subfamilies need to be recognised at family level: Clusioideae as Clusiaceae sensu stricto; Hypericoideae as Hypericaceae; and Kielmeyeroideae as Calophyllaceae.

Classification
Following Ruhfel et al. (2011) 

Tribe Clusieae
 Chrysochlamys
 Clusia
 Dystovomita
 Tovomita
 Tovomitopsis

Tribe Garcinieae
 Allanblackia
 Garcinia (including Rheedia) - saptree, mangosteen

Tribe Symphonieae
 Lorostemon
 Montrouziera
 Moronobea
 Pentadesma
 Platonia
 Symphonia
 Thysanostemon

See also
 List of Clusiaceae genera

References

Bibliography

External links 
 See Guttiferae in L. Watson and M.J. Dallwitz (1992 onwards). The families of flowering plants: descriptions, illustrations, identification, information retrieval. https://web.archive.org/web/20070103200438/http://delta-intkey.com/
 Garcinia Rat Studies 
 See Key to Clusiaceae (Guttiferae) genera from Brazil (in Portuguese)

 
Malpighiales families